Leon L. (Doc) Bryan (January 31, 1920 – October 24, 1995) was an American politician. He was a member of the Arkansas House of Representatives, serving from 1967 to 1995. He was a member of the Democratic party. He died of hepatitis in 1995.

References

1995 deaths
1920 births
People from Johnson County, Arkansas
20th-century American politicians
Speakers of the Arkansas House of Representatives
Democratic Party members of the Arkansas House of Representatives